Andrew James 'Andy' Pilley (born May 26, 1970) is an English businessperson and current chairman and owner of English football League One club Fleetwood Town F.C. and League of Ireland First Division club Waterford F.C., the chairman of independent commercial utility group BES Utilities,  Managing Director of independent utility sales agency network Commercial Power as well as Card Saver for BES Metering Services, The Leisure Channel, and Breck Apartments Blackpool.

Background
Following the collapse of the large energy company Enron, Pilley was left unemployed. He then founded his own utilities brokerage business,

Fleetwood Town Football Club
In 2004, Pilley became involved with the Fleetwood Town Football Club. Pilley has now made many investments to the club, allowing for the complete renovation of the Highbury stadium in 2011. Pilley also owns Waterford FC

Business Energy Solutions (BES Utilities)

2002: Business Energy Solutions 
In the midst of deregulation in the UK energy market, Pilley founded his gas brokerage business, BES Utilities. He was later joined by his sister Michelle Davidson.

2005: Gas supply licence granted 
In February 2005, a gas supply licence was approved for Business Energy Solutions Ltd.

2008: Gas shipper licence approved 
After receiving a licence from Ofgem, BES Utilities became a licensed gas shipper in March 2008.

2009: Electricity licence granted 
Pilley acquired an electricity supply licence for BES Commercial Electricity Ltd in 2009 (both companies now form the BES Utilities group). Since then, the companies have seen significant growth, and they are now one of the largest employers on the Fylde coast, with over 200 staff based at their Head Office in Fleetwood, Lancashire.

2014: Shortlisted for top industry awards 
BES Utilities was shortlisted for the Treating Customers Fairly Award in The Utilities & Telecoms Awards 2014.

2018: South Africa expansion 
In 2018, BES Utilities created a new customer relations team based in Cape Town, South Africa.

2019: BES Utilities and ESPO contract 
BES Utilities signed a contract with ESPO worth an estimated £600m that aims to decrease energy costs for public sector, including emergency services, schools, and more.

BES Utilities Legal Action

In January 2018, BES Utilities settled a High Court case against two men, in which the company had alleged that they had made false claims about the company for three years.[9][10] 

Following the hearing in the High Court at Manchester, the defendants were issued with court orders containing penal notices. They gave undertakings to the court to cease their behaviour and remove any published reference to BES, its directors, employees, agents, and representatives.   If the men fail to comply with the order, they may be held in contempt of court and be fined or imprisoned. The court also ordered that if the defendants breach the undertakings, they would be required to pay £250,000 towards BES’s substantial legal costs. 

Both defendants signed the following statement: “We withdraw any allegation of fraud or dishonesty against Business Energy Solutions Limited and BES Commercial Electricity Limited, their directors, officers, agents, legal advisers, and other professional representatives.”    

Should Andy and those facing similar charges be found guilty following the outcome of the ongoing trial, the allegations made by the two men against BES Utilities may prove not to be false.

Criminal Investigation and Fraud Charges

In September 2021 after a 5-year fraud investigation, Pilley was charged with multiple fraud charges concerning his running of BES Utilities. Fraud charges included two counts of running a business to defraud creditors or others by allowing the fraudulent mis-selling of energy supply contracts, allowing fraudulent mis-selling by sales representatives, and being concerned with the retention of criminal property.

The criminal trial is currently taking place as of October 2022 at Preston Crown Court.

OFGEM Investigation

BES Utilities was investigated by the Office of Gas and Electricity Markets (Ofgem), which found that BES failed to explain in sufficient detail customer contract details and, in some cases, wrongly blocked 108 customers from switching suppliers. The Ofgem investigation resulted in a fine of £2.00, with an agreed redress package of circa £980,000 paid by BES by way of a charitable donation to a debt advice charity and via compensation payments to several affected customers. ===OFGEM Investigation===

Smart Choice Metering Ltd 
In 2019, Andy announced the launch of his own specialist metering services division following the acquisition of Liverpool-based metering, asset, and management company, Access Install. All 80 existing jobs were protected, and there will be a further seven-figure investment in the next 12 months. The acquisition strengthens his company's smart meter offering as the government aims to install more than 53 million smart meters in homes and businesses by the end of 2025, this includes a partnership with energy supplier Green.

Commercial Power Ltd 
Formed in 2005, Commercial Power is one of the biggest and most established gas and electricity aggregators in the UK, having helped over 300,000 commercial businesses make savings on their gas and electricity bills.

Card Saver Ltd 
Formed in August 2014 by Andy and Michelle Davidson, Card Saver is one of the UK’s fastest-growing and award-winning card payment processing providers, helping businesses accept secure card payments in-store, online, or over the phone. Card Saver is rated amongst the top 10 payment providers in the UK, and in 2018 received the ISO of the Year award from Optomany.

Breck Apartments Blackpool 
Opened by Andy in 2016, Breck Apartments offers luxury boutique apartments situated in the heart of Blackpool. Comprising six one and two-bedroom apartments overlooking the beach along Blackpool’s famous coastline, Breck Apartments are proud to offer five-star service and attention to detail.

Charity, Community & Sponsorship

Fleetwood Town Community Trust 
In 2012, Pilley and fellow trustees founded the Fleetwood Town Community Trust, an independent, registered charity working in partnership with Fleetwood Town Football Club. The Trust is an active community project that aims to provide socially inclusive community, health, and education engagement programmes within its local community.

Trinity Hospice
Andy is a supporter of Trinity Hospice. In the Summer of 2013, BES Utilities supported the Trinity Hospice Corporate Challenge, and more recently, Card Saver has donated merchant service terminals to Trinity Hospice and Brian House Children’s Hospice enabling members of the public to donate by card rather than having to look for loose change.

Tackling Bullying in Schools 
In February 2019 it was announced that Andy and FTFC would pledge £10,000 to help tackle bullying in schools by supporting a ground-breaking training programme headed up by local Human Behaviour Trainer and Success Coach, Norry Ascroft. Following on from the success earlier in the year Andy, along with BES Utilities and Card Saver, pledged a further £20,000 to the MADD About Bullying programme, supporting over 300 schools in the North West directly.

Providing free and at-cost electricity for Blackpool Illuminations 
BES Utilities sponsored Blackpool illuminations, providing free electricity in 2014 and half-price electricity in 2015. Their sponsorship was worth over £100,000 over two years – the biggest donation to the Lights in more than a decade.

Sponsor of local champion boxer, Brian Rose 
Fleetwood Town FC, BES Utilities, and Card Saver all sponsor local professional boxer Brian 'The Lion' Rose. As well as providing sponsorship, Andy has given Brian full use of the state-of-the-art facilities at Poolfoot Farm, along with access to coaches and physios.

Maintaining East Pines Park 
In 2018, Andy and Fleetwood Town FC partnered with East Pines Park and offered to maintain their football pitches. The pitches were often completely out of use due to poor drainage, and after playing football at East Pines Park at a young age, Andy decided to step in and help. Following extensive improvement work and maintenance by the grounds team from Fleetwood Town, the pitch now plays host to a variety of community football sessions for youngsters as well as weekly walking football sessions for older players.

Support for Amputee Footballers 
The story of a local young footballer, Jamie Oakey, who was born with one foot inspired Andy to support England’s next generation of amputee players. Jamie, who was named in the England Amputee FA’s under-23 squad, is also part of a group of junior players hoping to take part in an international training camp in Hoffenheim, Germany, in July. To get there the young amputees and their families needed to raise £5,000, so Andy decided to provide financial support for the German training camp as well as give the England squad free use of the Cod Army’s Poolfoot Farm training base whenever they needed it.

More 

 Sponsor of Thornton Christmas Lights
 Creation of the BES Fund to support businesses struggling with energy or other debts
 Funder of national charity, Business Debtline

Political views
Pilley endorsed the Conservative Party in the 2019 United Kingdom general election.

References

External links

1970 births
Living people
English businesspeople
Fleetwood Town F.C.
People from Blackpool
English football chairmen and investors
Conservative Party (UK) people